Giovanni dei Gualtieri (1565 – 20 May 1619) was a Roman Catholic prelate who served as Bishop of Sansepolcro (1615–1619).

Biography
Giovanni dei Gualtieri was born in 1565.
On 2 December 1615, he was appointed during the papacy of Pope Paul V as Bishop of Sansepolcro.
On 6 December 1615, he was consecrated bishop by Metello Bichi, Cardinal-Priest of Sant'Alessio with Marco Cornaro, Bishop of Padova, and Leonardus Roselli, Bishop Emeritus of Vulturara e Montecorvino, serving as co-consecrators. 
He served as Bishop of Sansepolcro until his death on 20 May 1619.

References 

1565 births
1619 deaths
17th-century Italian Roman Catholic bishops
Bishops appointed by Pope Paul V